The Air Force Specialty Code (AFSC) is an alphanumeric code used by the United States Air Force to identify a specific job. Officer AFSCs consist of four characters and enlisted AFSCs consist of five characters. A letter prefix or suffix may be used with an AFSC when more specific identification of position requirements and individual qualifications is necessary. The AFSC is similar to the Military Occupational Specialty Codes (MOS Codes) used by the United States Army and the United States Marine Corps or enlisted ratings and USN officer designators and Naval Officer Billet Classifications (NOBCs) used by the United States Navy and enlisted ratings and USCG officer specialties used by the United States Coast Guard. The United States Space Force equivalent is known as the Space Force Specialty Code (SFSC).

History
After the Air Force separated from the Army in 1947, it retained the Army's system of MOS occupation codes, modifying them in 1954. These were 5-digit codes; for example a maintenance data systems specialist was 39150 and a weather technician was 25170. In October 1993, the Air Force implemented a new system of AFSCs, aligning occupations with the force wide restructuring that was implemented under Merrill McPeak. These reduced officer AFSCs from 216 to 123 and enlisted AFSCs from 203 to 176.

Enlisted AFSCs

The enlisted AFSC consists of five alphanumeric characters:
 Career group (Numerical)
 Operations
 Logistics & Maintenance
 Support
 Medical
 Professional
 Acquisition
 Special Investigations
 Special Duty Identifiers, typically used for Airmen chosen for specialized jobs
 Reporting Identifiers, typically used for Airmen in transitive status: trainees, awaiting retraining, prisoner, etc. And occasionally for Airmen chosen for specialized jobs. 
 Career field (Alpha, different for each)
 Career field subdivision (Numerical, different for each)
 Skill level
 1 – Helper (recruits or trainees in technical school)
 3 – Apprentice (technical school graduates applying and expanding their job skills)
 5 – Journeyman (experienced Airmen functioning as front-line technicians and initial trainers)
 7 – Craftsman (Airmen with many years of experience in the specialty, responsible for supervision and training)
 9 – Superintendent (Airmen in the grade of Senior Master Sergeant and above, with at least 14 years of experience, responsible for broad supervision)
 0 – Chief Enlisted Manager (CEM) (Airmen in the grade of Chief Master Sergeant responsible for policy and direction on a broad scale, from the individual squadron to HQ USAF levels)
 Specific AFSC (Numeric, specialty within career field subdivision)

For example, in the AFSC 1N371:
 The career group is 1 (Operations)
 The career field is N (Intelligence)
 The career field subdivision is 3 (Cryptologic Linguist)
 The skill level is 7 (Craftsman)
 The specific AFSC is 1 (Crypto-Linguist)

For some specialties, an alpha prefix is used to denote a special ability, skill, qualification or system designator not restricted to a single AFSC (such as "X" for an aircrew position). Additionally, an alpha suffix (a "shredout") denotes positions associated with particular equipment or functions within a single specialty (an Afrikaans specialist in the Germanic linguist field would have an "E" shredout). Using the above example, the AFSC X1N371E would refer to a Germanic Cryptologic Linguist who is aircrew qualified and specializes in Afrikaans.

Here is an extended listing of AFSC groups. Most categories have numerous actual AFSCs in them.

Operations
 1A – Aircrew Operations 
 1A0X1 – In-Flight Refueling Specialist
 1A1X1 – Flight engineer
 1A2X1 – Aircraft Loadmaster
 1A3X1 – Airborne Mission Systems Specialist  
 1A6X1 – Flight attendant
 1A8X1 – Airborne Cryptologic Language Analyst
 1A8X2 – Airborne Intelligence, Surveillance, and Reconnaissance Operator
 1A9X1 – Special Mission Aviator 
 1B – Cyber Warfare 
 1B4X1 – Cyber Warfare Operations
 1C – Command and control Systems Operations 
 1C0X2 – Aviation Resource Management
 1C1X1 – Air traffic control  
 1C3X1 – Command and Control Operations (C2 OPS) 
 1C5X1 – Command and Control Battle Management Ops (1C5X1D Weapons Director)
 1C6X1 – Space Systems Operations 
 1C7X1 – Airfield Management
 1C8X3 – Radar, Airfield & Weather Systems (RAWS)
 1D – Cyber Defense Operations; implemented on 31 October 2021 as a direct replacement for 3DXXX career fields  
 1D7X1 – Cyber Defense Operations
 1D7X1A – Network Operations
 1D7X1B – Systems Operations
 1D7X1D – Security Operations
 1D7X1E – Client Systems Operations
 1D7X1K – Knowledge Operations
 1D7X1R – RF Operations
 1D7X1Z – Software Development Operations
 1D7X2 – Spectrum Defense Operations
 1D7X2F – Spectrum Operations
 1D7X3 – Cable and Antenna Defense Operations
 1D7X3C – Cable and Antenna Operations
 1H0X1 – Aerospace Physiology
 1N – Intelligence 
 1N0X1 – All Source Intelligence Analyst
 1N1X1 – Geospatial Intelligence
 1N2X1 – Signals intelligence Analyst
 1N3X1 – Cryptologic Language Analyst
 1N4X1 – Cyber Intelligence
 1N4X2 – Cryptologic Analyst & Reporter
 1N7X1 – Human Intelligence Specialist
 1N8X1 – Targeting Analyst

 1P – Aircrew Flight Equipment
 1P0X1 – Aircrew Flight Equipment

 1S – Safety
 1S0X1 – Safety

 1T – Special Warfare Enabler
 1T0X1 – Survival, Evasion, Resistance, and Escape (SERE) Specialist

 1U – Aircrew Operations (RPA) 
 1U0X1 – Sensor Operator
 1U1X1 – Remotely Piloted Aircraft (RPA) Pilot

 1W – Weather
 1W0X1 – Weather

 1Z – Special Warfare
 1Z1X1 – Pararescue
 1Z2X1 – Combat Control
 1Z3X1 – Tactical Air Control Party (TACP)
 1Z4X1 – Special Reconnaissance

Maintenance and Logistics

 2A – Aerospace Maintenance
 2A0X1 – Avionics Test Station and Components
 2A2X1 – Special Operations Forces/Personnel Recovery (SOF/PR) Integrated Communication/Navigation/Mission Systems
 2A2X2 – Special Operations Forces/Personnel Recovery (SOF/PR) Integrated Instrument and Flight Control Systems
 2A2X3 – Special Operations Forces/Personnel Recovery (SOF/PR) Integrated Electronic Warfare Systems
 2A3X3 – Tactical Aircraft Maintenance
 2A3X4 – Fighter Aircraft Integrated Avionics (A-10, U-2, F-15, F-16)
 2A3X5 – Advanced Fighter Aircraft Integrated Avionics (F-22, F-35, MQ-1, MQ-9, RQ-4)
 2A3X7 – Tactical Aircraft Maintenance (5th Generation) (F-22, F-35)
 2A3X8 – Remotely Piloted Aircraft Maintenance 
 2A5X1 – Airlift/Special Mission Aircraft Maintenance
 2A5X2 – Helicopter/Tiltrotor Aircraft Maintenance
 2A5X4 – Refuel/Bomber Aircraft Maintenance
 2A6X1 – Aerospace Propulsion
 2A6X2 – Aerospace Ground Equipment (AGE)
 2A6X3 – Aircrew Egress Systems
 2A6X4 – Aircraft Fuel Systems
 2A6X5 – Aircraft Hydraulic Systems
 2A6X6 – Aircraft Electrical and Environmental Systems
 2A7X1 – Aircraft Metals Technology
 2A7X2 – Nondestructive Inspection (NDI)
 2A7X3 – Aircraft Structural Maintenance
 2A7X5 – Low Observable Aircraft Structural Maintenance
 2A8X1 – Mobility Air Forces Integrated Communication/Navigation/Mission Systems
 2A8X2 – Mobility Air Forces Integrated Instrument and Flight Control Systems
 2A9X1 – Bomber/Special Integrated Communication/Navigation/Mission Systems
 2A9X2 – Bomber/Special Integrated Instrument and Flight Control Systems
 2A9X3 – Bomber/Special Electronic Warfare and Radar Surveillance Integrated Avionics

 2F – Fuels
 2F0X1 – Fuels

 2G – Logistics Plans
  2G0X1 – Logistics Plans

 2M – Missile and Space Systems Maintenance
 2M0X1 – Missile and Space Systems Electronic Maintenance
 2M0X2 – Missile and Space Systems Maintenance
 2M0X3 – Missile and Space Facilities
 2P – Precision Measurement Equipment Laboratory
  2P0X1 – Precision Measurement Equipment Laboratory
  2R – Maintenance Management
 2R0X1 – Maintenance Management Analysis
 2R1X1 – Maintenance Management Production
  2S – Materiel Management
 2S0X1 – Materiel Management

 2T – Transportation & Vehicle Management
 2T0X1 – Traffic Management
 2T1X1 – Ground Transportation
 2T2X1 – Air Transportation
 2T3X1 – Mission Generation Vehicular Equipment Maintenance
 2T3X1A – Firefighting and Refueling Vehicle & Equipment Maintenance
 2T3X1C – Material Handling Equipment (MHE)/463L Maintenance 
 2T3X7 – Fleet Management and Analysis

 2W – Munitions & Weapons
 2W0X1 – Munitions Systems
 2W1X1 – Aircraft Armament Systems
 2W2X1 – Nuclear Weapons

Support

 3E – Civil Engineering
 3E0X1 – Electrical Systems
 3E0X2 – Electrical Power Production
 3E1X1 – Heating, Ventilation, AC, and Refrigeration
 3E2X1 – Pavements and Construction Equipment
 3E3X1 – Structural
 3E4X1 – Water and Fuel Systems Maintenance
 3E4X3 – Pest Management
 3E5X1 – Engineering
 3E6X1 – Operations Management
 3E7X1 – Fire Protection
 3E8X1 – Explosive Ordnance Disposal 
 3E9X1 – Emergency Management 
 3F – Force Support 
 3F0X1 – Personnel 
 3F1X1 – Services 
 3F2X1 – Education and Training 
 3F3X1 – Manpower 
 3F4X1 – Equal Opportunity 
 3F5X1 – Administration 
 3G0X1 – Talent Acquisition

 3H – Historian
 3H0X1 – Historian
 3N – Public Affairs 
 3N0X6 – Public Affairs
 3N1X1 – Regional Band 
 3N2X1 – Premier Band – The United States Air Force Band
 3N3X1 – Premier Band – The United States Air Force Academy Band
 3P – Security Forces 
 3P0X1 – Security Forces
 3P0X1A – Military Working Dog Handler
 3P0X1B – Combat Arms Training and Maintenance

Medical

 Medical
 4A0X1 – Health Services Management
 4A1X1 – Medical Material
 4A2X1 – Biomedical Equipment
 4B0X1 – Bioenvironmental Engineering
 4C0X1 – Mental Health Service
 4D0X1 – Diet Therapy
 4E0X1 – Public health 
 4H0X1 – Respiratory Care Practitioner
 4J0X2 – Physical Medicine
 4J0X2A – Orthotics
 4N0X1 – Aerospace Medical Service
4N0X1B – Neurodiagnostic Medical Technician
4N0X1C – Independent Duty Medical Technician
4N0X1D – Allergy/Immunization Medical Technician
4N0X1F – Flight and Operational Medical Technician 
 4N1X1 – Surgical Service
 4P0X1 – Pharmacy
 4R0X1 – Diagnostic Imaging
 4T0X1 – Medical Laboratory
 4T0X2 – Histopathology
 4V0X1 – Ophthalmic
 Dental
 4Y0X1 – Dental assistant
 4Y0X1H – Dental hygienist
 4Y0X2 – Dental laboratory

Professional

 5J – Paralegal
  5J0X1 – Paralegal
 5R – Religious Affairs
  5R0X1 – Religious Affairs

Acquisition

 6C – Contracting
  6C0X1 – Contracting
 6F – Financial
  6F0X1 – Financial Management and Comptroller

Special Investigations
 7S – Special Investigations (OSI)
 7S0X1 – Special Investigations

Special Duty Identifiers
 8A100 – Career Assistance Advisor
 8A200 – Enlisted Aide
 8A300 – Protocol (Established 31 Oct 15)
 8B000 – Military Training Instructor
 8B100 – Military Training Leader
 8B200 – Academy Military Training NCO
 8B300 – AFROTC Training Instructor
 8C000 – Airman & Family Readiness Center RNCO
 8D100 – Language & Culture Advisor
 8F000 – First Sergeant
 8G000 – United States Air Force Honor Guard
 8G100 – Base Honor Guard Program Manager
 8H000 – Airmen Dorm Leader
 8I000 – Superintendent, Inspector General
 8I100 – Inspections Coordinator
 8I200 – Complaints & Resolution Coordinator
 8K000 – Software Development Specialist
 8L100 – Air Advisor Basic
 8L200 – Air Advisor Basic, Team Sergeant
 8L300 – Air Advisor Basic, Team Leader
 8L400 – Air Advisor Advanced
 8L500 – Air Advisor Advanced, Team Sergeant
 8L600 – Air Advisor Advanced, Team Leader
 8L700 – Combat Aviation Advisor
 8L800 – Combat Aviation Advisor Team Sergeant
 8L900 – Combat Aviation Advisor Team Leader
 8P000 – Courier
 8P100 – Defense Attaché
 8R000 –  Enlisted Accessions Recruiter
 8R200 – Second-Tier Recruiter
 8R300 – Third-Tier Recruiter
 8S000 – Missile Facility Manager
 8S200 – Combat Crew Communications
 8T000 – Professional Military Education Instructor
 8T100 – Enlisted Professional Military Education Instructional System Designer
 8U000 – Unit Deployment Manager
 8U100 – Weapons of Mass Destruction Civil Support Team

Reporting Identifiers
 9A000 – Awaiting Retraining-Reasons beyond Control
 9A100 – Awaiting Retraining-Reasons within Control
 9A200 – Awaiting Discharge/Separation/Retirement for Reasons Within Their Control
 9A300 – Awaiting Discharge/Separation/Retirement for Reasons Beyond Their Control
 9A400 – Disqualified Airman, Return to Duty Program
 9A500 – Temporarily Ineligible for Retraining – Disqualified for Reasons Beyond Control
 9C000 – Chief Master Sergeant of the Air Force
 9C100 – Executive Assistant to the Chief Master Sergeant of the Air Force
 9D100 – AF Developmental Senior Enlisted Positions
 9D200 – Key Developmental Senior Enlisted Positions
 9E000 – Command Chief Master Sergeant
 9E100 – Command Chief Executive Assistant
 9E200 – Individual Mobilization Augmentee to Command Chief Master Sergeant
 9F000 – First Term Airmen Center (FTAC) NCOIC
 9G100 – Group Superintendent
 9H000 – Academic Faculty Instructor
 9I000 - Futures Airmen
 9J000 – Prisoner
 9L000 – Interpreter/Translator
 9L100 – Enlisted Engagement Manager/International Affairs
 9M000 – Military Entrance Processing Command (MEPCOM) Senior Enlisted Advisor
 9M200 – International Health Specialists (IHS)
 9M400 – Chief, Medical Enlisted Force (CMEF)
 9N000 – Secretary of the Air Force Enlisted Legislative Fellows
 9P000 – Patient
 9Q000 – Reserve Force Generation and Oversight NCO
 9R000 – Civil Air Patrol (CAP)-USAF Reserve Assistance NCO
 9S000 – Chief Master Sergeant of the Space Force

 9S100 –  Scientific Applications Specialist
 9T000 – Basic Enlisted Airman
 9T100 – Officer Trainee
 9T200 – Precadet Assignee
 9T400 – AFIT/EWI Enlisted Student
 9T500 – Basic Special Warfare Enlisted Airman
 9U000 – Enlisted Airman Ineligible for Local Utilization
 9U100 – Unallotted Enlisted Authorization
 9V000 – Key Developmental Joint Senior Enlisted Position
 9W000 – Combat Wounded Warrior
 9W100 – Reserved for Future Use
 9W200 – Combat Wounded Warrior with Exemptions
 9W300 – Non-Combat Wounded Warrior
 9W400 – Wounded Warrior – Limited Assignment Status (LAS)
 9W500 – Reserved for Future Use
 9W600 – Reserved for Future Use
 9W700 – Reserved for Future Use
 9W800 – Wounded Warrior – Ambassador
 9W900 – Wounded Warrior – Project Planner/Officer

No longer in use 
 1C0X1 – Airfield Management Apprentice
 1N5X1 – Electronic Signals Intelligence Exploitation Apprentice
 1N6X1 – Electronic Systems Security Assessment Apprentice
 2A5X3 – Mobility Air Forces Electronic Warfare Systems
 3C - Communications (deactivated on 1 November 2009 and replaced by 3DXXX)
 3C0X1 - Communications - Computer Systems Operations
 3D – Cyberspace Support (activated on 1 November 2009, merging 2EXXX, 3AXXX, and 3CXXX; deactivated on 1 November 2021 and replaced by 1D7XX)
 3D0X1 – Knowledge Operations Management
 3D0X2 – Cyber Systems Operations
 3D0X3 – Cyber Surety (IA which includes COMSEC, EMSEC, and COMPUSEC)
 3D0X4 – Computer Systems Programming
 3D1X1 – Client Systems
 3D1X2 – Cyber Transport Systems
 3D1X2R – Data Links
 3D1X3 – RF Transmission Systems
 3D1X4 – Spectrum Operations
 3D1X7 – Cable and antenna systems
3D190 – Cyberspace Support Superintendent (merged with 3D090 in 2015)
3D100 – Chief Enlisted Manager
 3N0X2 – Broadcast Journalist (merged with 3N0X6 effective 1 October 2020)
 3N0X5 – Photojournalist (merged with 3N0X6 effective 1 October 2020)
 4M0X1 – Aerospace and Operational Physiology (renamed 1H0X1)
 8M000 – Postal service

Officer AFSCs
The officer AFSC consists of four alphanumeric characters:
 Career Group (Numerical)
 1 (Operations)
 2 (Logistics)
 3 (Support)
 4 (Medical)
 5 (Professional Services)
 6 (Acquisition)
 7 (Special Investigations)
 8 (Special Duty Identifier)
 9 (Reporting Identifier)
 Utilization Field (Numerical, different for each)
 Functional Area (Alpha, different for each)
 Qualification Level
 0 – Qualified commander (when used in conjunction with “C” in the 3rd position)
 1 – Entry (any AFSC)
 2 – Intermediate (is only used for pilots, bomber navigators, missile launch officers, and cyberspace officers)
 3 – Qualified (any AFSC)
 4 – Staff (relates only to the level of functional responsibility and is restricted to positions above wing level; it does not denote additional specialty qualifications)

For example, in the AFSC 11M4:
 The career group is 11 (Pilot)
 The functional area is M (Mobility)
 The qualification level is 4 (Staff)

For example, in the AFSC T63A3
 The career group is 63 (acquisition manager)
 The functional area is A (all 63 officers are "A")
 The qualification level is 3 (fully qualified)
 The prefix "T" designates a formal training instructor (other prefixes are available for other specialty positions)

As with enlisted AFSCs, prefixes and suffixes may be applied to make the AFSC more specific.

Operations
 10C0 – Operations Commander
 11BX – Bomber Pilot
 11EX – Experimental Test Pilot
 11FX – Fighter Pilot
 11GX – Generalist Pilot
 11HX – Rescue Pilot (includes both helicopter and fixed-wing)
 11KX – Trainer Pilot
 11MX – Mobility Pilot
 11RX – Recce/Surv/Elect Warfare Pilot
 11SX – Special Operations Pilot
 11UX – Remotely Piloted Aircraft (RPA) Pilot
 12BX – Bomber Combat Systems Officer
 12EX – Experimental Test Combat Systems Officer
 12FX – Fighter Weapon Systems Officer (WSO)
 12GX – Generalist Combat Systems Officer
 12HX – Rescue Combat Systems Officer
 12KX – Trainer Combat Systems Officer
 12MX – Mobility Combat Systems Officer
 12RX – Recce/Surv/Elect Warfare Combat Systems Officer
 12SX – Special Operations Combat Systems Officer
 12UX – Remotely Piloted Aircraft Pilot
 13AX – Astronaut
 13BX – Air Battle Manager

 13MX – Airfield Operations
 13NX – Nuclear and Missile Operations

 13OX – Multi-Domain Warfare Officer
 13SX – Space Operations

 14FX – Information Operations
 14NX – Intelligence

 15AX – Operations Research Analyst (Operations Analysis Officer effective 30 April 2022) (formerly 61AX)

 15W – Weather and Environmental Sciences Officer
 16FX – Foreign Area Officer
 16GX – Air Force Operations Staff Officer
 16PX – Political-Military Affairs Strategist
 16RX – Planning & Programming
 17CX – Cyberspace Operations Commander
 17DX – Cyberspace Operations
 17SX – Cyberspace Warfare Operations Officer
 18AX – Attack Remotely Piloted Aircraft Pilot (18X established in October 2009)
 18GX – Generalist Remotely Piloted Aircraft Pilot
 18RX – Recce Remotely Piloted Aircraft Pilot
 19ZX – Special Warfare Officer
 19ZXA – Special Tactics Officer
 19ZXB – Tactical Air Control Party (TACP) Officer
 19ZXC – Combat Rescue Officer

Logistics
 20C0 – Maintenance Group Commander or Deputy Group Commander
 21AX – Aircraft Maintenance Officer (MXO)
 21MX – Munitions and Missile Maintenance
 21RX – Logistics Readiness Officer (LRO)

Support
 30C0 – Mission Support Group Commander or Deputy Group Commander
 31PX – Security Forces
 32EX – Civil Engineer
 35BX – Band
 35PX – Public Affairs

 38FX – Force Support (Services, Personnel, & Manpower) (previously 38PX)

Medical

 40C0 – Medical Commander

 41AX – Hospital Administration, Health Services Administrator and Medical Service Corps
 42BX – Physical Therapist
 42EX – Optometrist
 42FX – Podiatrist
 42GX – Physician Assistant
 42NX – Audiology/Speech Pathologist
 42PX – Clinical Psychologist
 42SX – Clinical Social Worker
 42TX – Occupational Therapist Biomedical Specialists
 43AX – Aerospace & Operational Physiologist

 43BX – Biomedical Scientist
 43DX – Dietitian
 43EX – Bioenvironmental Engineer
 43HX – Public health
 43MX – Medical Entomologist
 43PX – Pharmacist
 43TX – Biomedical Laboratory
 44AX – Chief, Hospital/Clinic Services
 44BX – Preventive Medicine
 44DX – Pathologist
 44EX – Emergency Services Physician
 44FX – Family Physician
 44GX – General Practice Physician
 44HX – Nuclear Medicine Physician
 44JX – Clinical Geneticist
 44KX – Pediatrician
 44MX – Internist
 44NX – Neurologist
 44PX – Psychiatrist
 44RX – Diagnostic Radiologist
 44SX – Dermatologist
 44TX – Radiotherapist
 44UX – Occupational Medicine
 44YX – Critical Care Medicine
 44ZX – Allergist
 45AX – Anesthesiologist
 45BX – Orthopedic Surgeon
 45EX – Ophthalmologist
 45GX – OB/GYN
 45NX – Otorhinolaryngologist
 45PX – Physical Medicine Physician
 45SX – Surgeon
 45UX – Urologist

 46AX – Nurse Administrator
 46FX – Flight Nurse
 46GX – Nurse-Midwife
 46MX – Nurse Anesthetist
 46NX – Clinical Nurse
 46PX – Mental Health Nurse
 46SX – Operating Room Nurse
 46YX – Privileged Advanced Practice Nurse
 47BX – Orthodontist
 47DX – Oral and Maxillofacial Pathologist
 47EX – Endodontist

 47GX – Dentist
 47HX – Periodontist
 47KX – Pediatric Dentist
 47PX – Prosthodontist
 47SX – Oral and Maxillofacial Surgeon
 48AX – Aerospace Medicine Specialist
 48GX – General Medical Officer (GMO), Flt Surg
 48RX – Residency Trained Flight Surgeon
 48VX – Pilot-Physician

Professional

 51JX – Judge Advocate
 52RX – Chaplain

Acquisition

 60C0 – Program Director
 61BX – Behavioral Science/Human Factors Scientist
 61CX – Chemist/Biologist
 61DX – Physicist/Nuclear Engineer
 61DXN - Physicist (Nuclear Shredout)
 62EX – Developmental Engineer
 62EXA – Aeronautical Engineer
 62EXB – Astronautical Engineer
 62EXC – Computer Systems Engineer
 62EXE – Electrical/Electronic Engineer
 62EXF – Flight Test Engineer
 62EXG – Project Engineer
 62EXH – Mechanical Engineer
 62S0 – Materiel Leader
 63AX – Acquisition Manager
 63G0 – Senior Materiel Leader
 63S0 – Materiel Leader
 64PX – Contracting
 65AX – Auditor
 65FX – Financial Management
 65WX – Cost Analysis

Special Investigations
 71SX – Special Investigator

Special Duty Identifiers
 80C0 – Commander, Cadet Squadron, USAFA
 81C0 – Training Commander, OTS
 81T0 – Instructor
 82A0 – Academic Program Manager
 83R0 – Recruiting Service
 84H0 – Historian
 85G0 – USAF Honor Guard
 86M0 – Operations Management
 86P0 – Command and Control
 87G0 – Installation Inspector General
 88A0 – Aide-de-Camp
 88B0 - Protocol Officer
 89A0 – Air Advisor (Basic)
 89B0 – Air Advisor (Basic) Team Leader
 89C0 – Air Advisor (Basic) Mission Commander
 89D0 – Air Advisor (Advanced)
 89E0 – Air Advisor (Advanced) Team Leader
 89F0 – Air Advisor (Advanced) Mission Commander
 89G0 – Combat Aviation Advisor
 89H0 – Combat Aviation Advisor Team Leader
 89I0 – Combat Aviation Advisor Mission Commander
 89W0 – Weapons of Mass Destruction Civil Support Team

Reporting Identifiers
 90G0 – General officer
 91C0 – Commander
 91W0 – Wing Commander
 92J0 – Nondesignated Lawyer
 92J1 – AFROTC Educational Delay-Law Student
 92J2 – Funded Legal Education Program Law Student
 92J3 – Excess Leave Law Student
 92M0 – Health Professions Scholarship Program (HPSP) Medical Student
 92M1 – Uniformed Services University of Health Sciences Student
 92M2 – HPSP Biomedical Science Student
 92R0 – Chaplain Candidate
 92S0 – Student Officer Authorization
 92T0 – Pilot Trainee
 92T1 – Navigator/Combat Systems Officer Trainee
 92T2 – Air Battle Manager Trainee
 92T3 – Remotely Piloted Aircraft (RPA) Pilot Trainee
 92W0 – Wounded Warrior – Combat Related
 92W1 – Reserved for Future Use
 92W2 – Wounded Warrior
 92W3 – Wounded Warrior-Returned to Duty
 92W4 – Wounded Warrior-Limited Assignment Status
 92W5 – Wounded Warrior-Retired/Discharged
 92W9 – Warrior Care
 93P0 – Patient
 94N0 – Nuclear Weapons Custodian
 95A0 – Non-Extended Active Duty AFRC or ANG USAFA Liaison Officer or CAP Liaison Officer
 96D0 – Officer not available in awarded AFSC for cause
 96U0 – Unclassified Officer
 96V0 – Unallotted
 97E0 – Executive Officer
 99G0 – Gold Bar Recruiter

Additional information
During the course of their Air Force careers, Airmen sometimes switch jobs and receive multiple AFSCs to denote training in multiple specialties. A Primary AFSC (PAFSC) is the designation for the specialty in which the individual possesses the highest skill level and is, therefore, the AFSC that he or she is best qualified to perform. The Duty AFSC (DAFSC) reflects the actual manpower position the Airman is assigned to. The Control AFSC (CAFSC) is a management tool to make assignments, assist in determining training requirements, and consider individuals for promotion. Often an enlisted Airman's PAFSC will reflect a higher skill level than his or her CAFSC since the CAFSC skill level is tied to rank while the PAFSC skill level is tied to performance and education.

Usually, the PAFSC, DAFSC, and CAFSC will be the same. However, situations such as retraining, special duties, or Air Force-level changes necessitate these distinctions. Additionally, Airmen that have retrained into multiple specialties will have several Secondary AFSCs (2AFSC, 3AFSC, etc.). Air Force officers are limited to 3 AFSCs in MilPDS while Enlisted may have 4 AFSCs on record.

Special Experience Identifiers (SEIs) are established to identify special experience and training. The Air Force Enlisted Classification Directory (AFECD) and Air Force Officer Classification Directory (AFOCD) Section III contains the complete list of authorized SEIs and includes designation criteria and authorized AFSC combinations. (AFMAN 36-2100)

See also
Badges of the United States Air Force
List of United States Army careers
List of United States Marine Corps MOS
List of United States Navy ratings
List of United States Navy staff corps
List of United States Coast Guard ratings
Military education and training

References

External links
 AFMAN 36-2100, Military Utilization and Classification (PDF)
 Tactical Aircraft Maintenance AFSC 2A3X3 Air Force Career 
 U.S. Air Force Officer Classification Directory (AFOCD) and U.S. Air Force Enlisted Classification Directory (AFECD) – Only accessible to military personnel

 
United States Air Force lists